The ancient Mahabhairav Temple is located at a hillock on the northern part of Tezpur town in  Assam, India. This Shiva temple was originally built of stone but the present one was renovated and built with concrete. During the Ahom rule, the kings especially of the Tungkhungia dynasty donated large area of Devotee land to the Temple and appointed pujaris, Paiks to look after the temple. The temple is now managed by the Government of Assam through a managing committee headed by the Deputy Commissioner, Sonitpur. Maha Shivaratri the annual festival of Shaivite branch of Hinduism is celebrated in the temple complex with devotees coming from far and wide. Laddu laced with Bhang, an edible preparation of cannabis and also mixed with milk and spices, are offered as prasad to Lord Shiva as per the rituals. Various puja are also conducted at this temple, pigeons are also freed that symbolizes that spirit of ancestors are being liberated.

Legend
The temple is dedicated to Lord Shiva and built by King Banasura. The Shiva linga of this temple is said to be made of 'Living Stone'  which grows over slowly by the years. Some people believe that Bana attained prosperity by worshipping Lord Shiva in this temple.

References

External links
Official site

Hindu temples in Assam
Shiva temples in Assam
Tezpur